Hawayein may refer to:

 Hawayein (film), a 2003 Bollywood film 
 "Hawayein", a song by Arijit Singh from the 2017 film Jab Harry Met Sejal